Finley Jack Burns (born 17 June 2003) is an English professional footballer who plays as a defender for Premier League side Manchester City.

Club career
In January 2017 it was confirmed that Burns would leave Southend United to join Manchester City for a reported fee of £175,000. On 21 September 2021 he made his professional debut when he was named in the starting line up for Manchester City's EFL Cup 6-1 win against Wycombe Wanderers.

On 30 January 2022, Burns joined EFL Championship side Swansea City on loan for the remainder of the 2021–22 season.
Burns made his EFL Championship debut on 13 February 2022.

International career
Burns has represented England at youth level.

On 21 September 2022, Burns made his England U20 debut during a 3-0 victory over Chile at the Pinatar Arena.

Career statistics

References

External links
 

2003 births
Living people
English footballers
Manchester City F.C. players
Swansea City A.F.C. players
Association football defenders
England youth international footballers
English Football League players
People from Southwark
Footballers from Greater London